Indonesian People's Revolutionary Front, abbreviated as BPRI, is an Indonesian militia founded by Sutomo with its headquarters in Surabaya on 12 October, 1945.

History 

The Indonesian People's Rebellion was aimed at realizing and defending the Proclamation of Indonesian Independence. The term "revolutionary front", and not "warrior front", was chosen because since the Dutch held power over the local population, who were ordinary people, and wanted to emphasise the fact their militia was led first and foremost by the common man. BPRI rallied the people's resistance against the Dutch who wanted to reign Indonesia after the Surrender of Japan in World War II.

The most prominent role of BPRI was its involvement in the Battle of Surabaya. At that time, Sutomo delivered a speech through a radio broadcast that rallied the people in Surabaya against the army of Allied forces.

Branches 

BPRI had branches in Kalimantan, among others:

 BPRI expedition IX Banjarmasin under the leadership of Mohd. Asnawie and H. Arsyad;
 BPRI VIII Brig. "S" Div. VI (NAROTAMA) Samarinda under the leadership of RP Joewono.

References 

History of Indonesia